José Casten Zulueta (November 23, 1889 – December 6, 1972) was a Filipino lawyer and politician. He served as Senate President for a brief period in 1953.

Early life and education
Jose Zulueta was born to Evaristo Zulueta and Atilana Casten. Zulueta studied at the Ateneo de Manila. In 1911 he was appointed as a stenographer at Court of First Instance. He studied law and graduated in 1916 for the entrance examination for the Philippine bar (bar exam) and started a law practice.

Career
Zueleta in 1928 was elected to the House of Representatives of the Philippines on behalf of the 1st constituency of Iloilo. He was re-elected several times, and he would sit in the House until 1946.
During the Japanese occupation, Zulueta was accused of collaboration, along with Jorge Vargas, Jorge Bocobo and Manuel Roxas, being the first to respond to General Homma's order to form an Executive Commission. After the establishment of the Philippine Republic in 1946, the Department of Interior was restored and Zulueta was appointed by President Manuel Roxas once again to head the agency until 1948. Zulueta's term was marked by heightened tensions with the Hukbalahap movement, with Zulueta instituting a pass system that was required of Central Luzon residents wishing to travel outside their towns. Like his mentor Roxas, he adopted a hardline attitude toward the Huks, declaring in 1947 that the Huks faced only two choices: surrender or annihilation. He gave carte blanche to the Philippine Constabulary in all their operations against "dissidents". He was in charge of negotiating several times with its leaders, including Luis Lava, Luis Taruc, Juan Feleo and Jose de Leon.

After his term as minister he stood in April 1949 successfully apply for a new term in the House of Representatives. Before the end of his term, he is more than two years later at the 1951 election elected to the Philippine Senate. In his time as a senator, which lasted until 1957, he was on April 30, 1953 until November 30, 1953 President of the Senate. Zulueta in 1959 was elected governor of his native province of Iloilo.Later, he was from 1969 to 1972 again delegate on behalf of the first constituency of Iloilo.

In 1946, Zulueta was elected as Speaker of the House of Representatives in the inaugural session of the Congress.

He became Senator (1951–1957) and was briefly elected the Senate President in 1953. He became Provincial Governor of Iloilo in 1959.

During the Marcos administration, he was made the Presidential Consultant on Local Government.

He is among the few Filipinos included in the World Biography, 1948 edition and in the International Who's Who, 1952 edition.

Personal life
Zulueta was married to Soledad B. Ramos.

References

 List of Iloilo 1st district representatives
Philippine Senate bio of Jose C. Zulueta, the first parts of which have been erroneously conflated with the life of the bibliographer Clemente Jose Zulueta (1876-1904), December 24, 2009)
 Department of Interior and Local Government History, accessed December 24, 2009
 William Pomery, The Philippines, pp, 117 and 153 (Accessed on December 24, 2009)
 Benedict Kerkvliet, The Huk Rebellion, p. 189, 190  (Accessed on December 24, 2009)

1889 births
1972 deaths
Liberal Party (Philippines) politicians
Presidents of the Senate of the Philippines
Speakers of the House of Representatives of the Philippines
People from Paco, Manila
People from Iloilo City
Governors of Iloilo
Filipino journalists
Senators of the 3rd Congress of the Philippines
Senators of the 2nd Congress of the Philippines
Members of the House of Representatives of the Philippines from Iloilo
Secretaries of the Interior and Local Government of the Philippines
Filipino collaborators with Imperial Japan
Roxas administration cabinet members
Members of the Philippine Legislature
Members of the National Assembly of the Philippines
Nacionalista Party politicians
Visayan people
Deputy Speakers of the House of Representatives of the Philippines